Jeff Stone is an American author, best known for a series of Kung Fu themed books for teens called The Five Ancestors, published by Random House.

Biography
Jeff Stone grew up in Detroit, Michigan, and currently lives in Indiana. Stone is married and has two kids, a son and a daughter. Stone was adopted as an infant. Stone holds a black belt in Shaolin Do Kung Fu. Stone graduated from Michigan State University with degrees in English and Journalism.

Works

The Five Ancestors series

 Tiger (2003)
 Monkey (2003)
 Snake (2005)
 Crane (2008)
 Eagle (2008)
 Mouse (2009) (titled Mantis in the U.K. and Australia)
 Dragon (2010)

The Five Ancestors: Out of the Ashes series
 Phoenix (2012)
 Lion (2013)
 Jackal (2014)

External links
Jeff Stone's Official Website

Year of birth missing (living people)
Living people
Writers from Detroit
American male writers
American adoptees
Michigan State University alumni